Erie–Torresdale station is an elevated rapid transit station in Philadelphia, Pennsylvania, served by the SEPTA Market–Frankford Line. It is located at the intersection of Kensington, Erie, and Torresdale avenues in the Juniata neighborhood of Northeast Philadelphia. The station is also served by SEPTA City Bus routes 3 and 56, both of which are former trolley lines.

History
Erie–Torresdale is part of the Frankford Elevated section of the line, which began service on November 5, 1922.

Between 1988 and 2003, SEPTA undertook a $493.3 million reconstruction of the  Frankford Elevated. Erie–Torresdale station was completely rebuilt on the site of the original station; the project included new platforms, elevators, windscreens, and overpasses, and the station now meets ADA accessibility requirements. The line had originally been built with track ballast and was replaced with precast sections of deck, allowing the station (and the entire line) to remain open throughout the project.

Station layout

The station building is located on the northwest corner of Kensington and Erie Avenues; Erie Avenue becomes Torresdale Avenue east of this intersection. There is also an exit-only staircase from the eastbound platform to southeast corner of the intersection.

References

External links

Images at NYCSubways.org
Station entrance from Google Maps Street View
Station exit from Google Maps Street View

SEPTA Market-Frankford Line stations
Railway stations in Philadelphia
Railway stations in the United States opened in 1922